John P. Foley (1938November 23, 1984) was an American lawyer and judge.  He was Presiding Judge of the Wisconsin Court of Appeals from 1981 until his death in 1984.

Biography
Foley graduated from the University of Wisconsin-Madison and Marquette University Law School and served in the United States Army. He died on November 23, 1984.

Legal career
After working with a private law firm, Foley was appointed a Wisconsin Circuit Court Judge by Governor Patrick Lucey in 1976. He was elected to the Court of Appeals in 1978 and became a Presiding Judge in 1981. Foley remained in that position until his death.

References

External links 

 Newspaper account, Madison Wisconsin State Journal, November 24, 1984, Page 35
 Find A Grave

Wisconsin Court of Appeals judges
Wisconsin lawyers
Military personnel from Wisconsin
United States Army soldiers
University of Wisconsin–Madison alumni
Marquette University Law School alumni
1984 deaths
1938 births
20th-century American judges
20th-century American lawyers